The warren hounds are a group of Mediterranean rabbit-hunting dog breeds. In Spanish, this type of breed is called podenco, in Catalan coniller, and in Portuguese podengo. 

Most warren hounds have erect ears, a smooth (or in some cases, wire) coat, a slender body, and a whip-like tail. But the Cretan hound has usually rose-ears and a curly or curved tail, while the Barrocal Algarvio is long-haired, and the Podenco Paternero and some Campaneros have a robust, almost mastiff-like body. 

Unlike hounds or sighthounds which rely on just one sense, warren hounds tend to work with three senses: smell, sight and hearing.

Breeds 
Warren Hound breeds include:

 Barrocal Algarvio (cão do barrocal algarvio), CPC: Initial Registration
 Ca Coniller de Menorca (ca de conills, in Spanish can de conejos de Menorca)
 Large (grande)
 Medium (mediano)
 Small (pequeño)
 Smooth-haired (corto)
 Rough-haired (áspero)
 Charnaigre (charnigou, charnego, in French charnigue, charnègre) (extinct)
 Cirneco dell'Etna, FCI/AKC
 Cirneco di Bagheria (cirneco della sicilia occidentale)
 Cirneco di Lampedusa (probably extinct)
 Cretan Hound (Κρητικός Λαγωνικός [kritikos lagonikos]), KOE/VDH
 Ibizan Hound (ca eivissenc, in Spanish podenco ibicenco), FCI/AKC
 Rough-haired (duro)
 Smooth-haired (liso)
 Long-haired (largo) - included to the rough-haired in the FCI standard, described separately in the RSCE standard
 Maneto, RSCE
 Pharaoh Hound (kelb-tal fenek, literally a "rabbit dog"), FCI/AKC
 Podenco Andaluz, RSCE
 Large (grande)
 Medium (mediana)
 Small (chica)
 Smooth-haired (Corto-type)
 Wire-haired (Cerdeño-type)
 Long-haired (Sedeño-type)
 Podenco Canario, FCI
 Podenco Enano del Hierro
 Podenco Orito (podenco orito español), RSCE: Grupos Étnicos
 Podenco Palmero (podenco canario de la laurisilva, podenco del monte de la laurisilva)
 Podenco Paternero (podenco de paterna)
 Podengo Crioulo (aracambé, in Portuguese podengo brasileiro, pé duro), Sociedade Brasileira de Cinofilia
 Large (grande) (not officially accepted by the SOBRACI breed standard)
 Medium (médio)
 Small (pequeno, miniatura, terrier de minas)
 Smooth-haired (curto)
 Rough-haired (duro)
 Long-haired (longo)
 Podengo Galego (coalleiro galego, in Spanish podenco gallego), Xunta de Galicia
 Smooth-haired (corto)
 Rough-haired (duro) (extinct)
 Portuguese Warren Hound (podengo português), FCI/AKC
 Large (grande)
 Medium (médio)
 Small (pequeno)
 Smooth-haired (liso, curto) 
 Wire-haired (cerdoso, longo)
 Xarnego Valencià (in Spanish podenco valenciano), RSCE
 Short-haired (pelo liso)
 Wire-haired (pelo duro)
 Long-haired (pelo sedeño)

References

Hounds